Paul F. Pruitt (February 3, 1922 – July 2, 2018) was an American politician in the state of Washington. He served the 34th district from 1977 to 1985. He died in July 2018 at the age of 96.

References

1922 births
2018 deaths
Democratic Party members of the Washington House of Representatives
People from Shelton, Nebraska